Sangue Oculto (English title: The Secret) is a Portuguese telenovela produced by SP Televisão and broadcast by SIC. It premiered on 19 September 2022. The telenovela is written by Sandra Santos with the collaboration of Pedro Barbosa da Silva, Andreia Vicente Martins, Joana Andrade, Manuel Mora Marques, Pedro Cavaleiro and Sara Cardoso. It stars Sara Matos, Sofia Alves, Luana Piovani, João Catarré, António Pedro Cerdeira, Maria João Pinho, Marcantónio Del Carlo, Mariana Pacheco and Cristóvão Campos.

Plot 
Thirty years ago, Vanda found out that Teresa, a housekeeper working at her home, was pregnant of twins from her own husband Olavo. While he was on a diplomatic mission abroad, Vanda seizes the opportunity to make Teresa hide her pregnancy by promising to help her with money, all the while planning for a way to getting rid of her.
With no way to contact Olavo, Teresa is forced to comply with Vanda, oblivious to the fact that she intends to take advantage of her pregnancy for herself, as her inability to bear children is one of the reasons for her marriage being strained.
On the day of the birth, Vanda dupes Teresa and takes her to an inactive delivery room at the hospital where she works as a doctor and, with the help of a colleague, drugs Teresa in order to do what she needs. Vanda's plan is to keep one of the children, whom she’ll raise as her own, and sell the other one to a couple abroad.
Teresa wakes up from labour and, believing that her first daughter is stillborn, manages to escape from the hospital before Vanda manages to steal her other child, Carolina. Knowing that her boss won’t let go, Teresa decides to flee the country. Meanwhile, Vanda presents the twin, Benedita to her husband, telling him that she was abandoned by her mother and that she wants to adopt her. Olavo is enamoured by the baby, oblivious to the fact that she actually is his own biological daughter.

Cast 
 Sara Matos as Carolina Batista, Benedita Corte Real and Júlia Pereira de Mello
 TBA as Young Carolina and Young Júlia
 Sofia Alves as Teresa Batista
 Laura Dutra as Young Teresa
 Luana Piovani as Vanda Corte Real
 Vitória Frate as Young Vanda
 João Catarré as Tiago Carvalho
 António Pedro Cerdeira as Olavo Corte Real
 João Gadelha as Young Olavo
 Maria João Pinho as Carmo Pereira de Mello
 Marcantonio Del Carlo as João Pereira de Mello
 Mariana Pacheco as Patrícia Pereira de Mello
 TBA as Young Patrícia
 Cristóvão Campos as Pedro Brito
 Soraia Chaves as Lídia Rocha
 Renato Godinho as Guilherme Mesquita
 Anabela Moreira as Sílvia Apolinário
 Sérgio Praia as António Jorge "Tojó" Rocha
 Manuela Couto as Remédios Brito
 Luís Alberto as Tadeu Batista
 Jorge Silva as Young Tadeu
 Lia Gama as Noémia Batista
 Margarida Bento as Young Noémia
 Carlos Cunha as Joaquim Agostinho
 Júlia Palha as Maria Pacheco
 João Jesus as Nelson Apolinário
 Carla Andrino as Fernanda "Naná" Pacheco
 Pedro Laginha as César Apolinário
 Ana Marta Ferreira as Bárbara Barreto
 Rui Unas as Fábio Lucas
 Melânia Gomes as Rosa Silva
 Filipe Matos as Mário Apolinário
 Guilherme Moura as Vasyl Kovalenko
 Inês Pires Tavares as Elsa Rocha
 Tiago Aldeia as Henrique Serôdio
 Maria Marques as Anna Batista
 Ricardo Lopes as Bruno Rocha

Guest stars 
 Adriano Luz as Alberto Mesquita
 Sisley Dias as Young Alberto
 Virgílio Castelo as Almeno Carvalho
 Xana Abreu as Becky Agostinho

Production 
In August 2021, the pre-production for the telenovela began. Almost a year later, the first scenes began to be filmed in Almada, in Costa da Caparica, with the rest of the cast in the same month, respectively on the 15 July 2022, and also later in SP Televisão studios. The recordings should end in January 2023, but were postponed to March due to the interruptions of the recordings of Lia Gama and Sofia Alves for health reasons in Q4 2022. The last scenes of Luana Piovani and Marcantónio Del Carlo were filmed on 30 January 2023 and Sara Matos on 2 March. The remaining cast finished the work on March 15.

Ratings 

Premiering with the purpose of raising the audiences left of its predecessors in the time slot (Amor Amor - Vol. 2 and Por Ti) saw the one of the worst pilot-episode rating of the first track of telenovelas broadcast by SIC, drawing a rating of 10.1 points and audience share of 20.8%.

Since the second episode, the telenovela begins to show some leadship in the audiences, although not be every day.

References

External links 

Portuguese telenovelas
2022 telenovelas
Sociedade Independente de Comunicação telenovelas
Portuguese-language telenovelas
Television shows set in Portugal
Television series about twins
Child abduction in television